Adriana Nanclares Romero (born 9 May 2002) is a Spanish footballer who plays as a goalkeeper for Real Sociedad.

Club career
Nanclares started her career at Aurrera Vitoria. She spent a year on loan at Oiartzun but, throughout that period, she still trained with Real Sociedad from Monday to Thursday every week and only trained with Oiartzun on a Friday. Following an injury to Real Sociedad's main goalkeeper Mariasun Quiñones, in the 2019–20 season, Nanclares was presented with an opportunity to make her debut in the opening league fixture against Valencia. She ended up playing in four games in September including the Valencia one.

References

External links
Profile at Real Sociedad

2002 births
Living people
Women's association football goalkeepers
Spanish women's footballers
People from Miranda de Ebro
Sportspeople from the Province of Burgos
Footballers from Castile and León
Oiartzun KE players
Real Sociedad (women) players
Primera División (women) players